Barak was a military general in the Book of Judges in the Bible.

Barak may also refer to:

People
 Barak (given name)
 Barak (surname)
 Ehud Barak (born 1942), Israeli politician
 Barak (Guantanamo captive 856), an Afghan detainee at Guantanamo Bay
 Barak (tribe), a tribe of Turkomans mainly inhabiting south-central Turkey

Places
 Barak, Iran (disambiguation)
 Barak, Israel
 Barak, Kyrgyzstan
 Barak, Lublin Voivodeship, Poland
 Barak, Masovian Voivodeship, Poland
 Barak River or Ovurei River, in India and Bangladesh
 Barak Valley, Assam, India
 Barak, Bayat

Military and weapons
 Barak Armored Brigade, an Israeli brigade 
 Operation Barak, a 1948 Haganah military operation north of Gaza
 Barak 1, an Israeli naval point-defense missile system
 Barak 8, an Indian-Israeli  surface-to-air missile
 SP-21 Barak, a pistol made by Israel Weapons Industries

Other uses
 Barak hound or Bosnian Broken-haired Hound, a dog breed
 Barak, a character in The Belgariad  by David Eddings

See also

 Barack (disambiguation)
 Mubarak (name), an Arabic variation of the name "Barak"
 Barakah, Arabic for "blessing"
 Barac (disambiguation)
 Barag (disambiguation)
 Baraq (disambiguation)
 Barrack (disambiguation)
 Baruch (given name), a given name
 Buraq (disambiguation)
 Baraka (disambiguation)
 Baraki Barak, home of the Baraki/Ormuri of Kurdish descent in Afghanistan's Logar Province
 Zadik–Barak–Levin syndrome, a human congenital disorder
 Barakzai, a number of different tribes in Afghanistan and western Pakistan
 Nawa, Afghanistan or Barak Khel, a village in Afghanistan